Chanturu a/l Suppiah (born 14 December 1987) is a Malaysian professional footballer who plays as a right winger for a Sarawak United.

Club career

Early career
Chanturu was born in Kulim, Kedah but he never played for his hometown team Kedah as a professional footballer. He started his career in football with Telekom Malaysia President Cup at the age of 19 in 2007. In 2008, he joined Kuala Lumpur President's Cup team.

Kelantan
Chanturu signed a contract with Penang in 2009. His performance during a league match against Kelantan has attracted Kelantan's coach that time, B. Sathianathan. For 2010 season, he officially signed a contract with Kelantan. He has won the 2010 Malaysia Cup, the 2011 Malaysia Super League title, the 2012 Malaysia Super League title, the 2012 Malaysia FA Cup and the 2012 Malaysia Cup while playing for Kelantan. During his stay with Kelantan, he was also affectionately nicknamed the "Kelantan Express" or "Turbo Chan" by Kelantan's fans for his superb speed on the field.

Perak
In 2013, Chanturu signed a contract with Perak.

Melaka United
On 21 November 2017, Chanturu agreed to join Melaka United on a season-long loan move from Johor Darul Ta'zim. He made his debut for Melaka United in a 2–1 win over Kelantan on 3 February 2018.

International career

Malaysia Under-23
Chanturu was the member of Malaysia U-23 since 2010. He has made several appearances and scored goal for the team.

Malaysia
In year 2010, Chanturu made his debut for Malaysia national team. In June 2012, he was called up by Malaysia coach, Datuk K. Rajagobal for friendly matches against Philippines and Singapore.

Career statistics

Club

International

International goals
As of match played 6 June 2016. Malaysia score listed first, score column indicates score after each S.Chanturu goal.

Honours

Club
Kelantan
 Malaysia Cup: 2010, 2012
 Malaysia Super League: 2011, 2012
 Malaysia Charity Shield: 2011
 Malaysia FA Cup: 2012

Johor Darul Ta'zim
 Malaysia Super League: 2015, 2016, 2017
 Malaysia Charity Shield: 2015, 2016
 Malaysia FA Cup: 2016
 Malaysia Cup: 2017
 AFC Cup: 2015

References

External links
 
 

1987 births
Living people
Malaysian footballers
Malaysia international footballers
Perak F.C. players
Kelantan FA players
Penang F.C. players
Sarawak United FC players
People from Kedah
Malaysian people of Tamil descent
Malaysian sportspeople of Indian descent
Johor Darul Ta'zim F.C. players
Malaysia Super League players
Association football wingers
Association football forwards
Footballers at the 2010 Asian Games
Asian Games competitors for Malaysia
AFC Cup winning players